Nahum Mattathias Sarna (Hebrew: נחום סרנא; March 27, 1923 – June 23, 2005) was a modern biblical scholar who is best known for the study of Genesis and Exodus represented in his Understanding Genesis (1966) and in his contributions to the first two volumes of the JPS Torah Commentary (1989/91).  He was also part of the translation team for the Kethuvim section of the Jewish Publication Society's  translation of the Bible, known as New Jewish Publication Society of America Version.

Biography 
Nahum Sarna was born in London in 1923 to Jacob J. Sarna and Milly (Horonzick) Sarna, and received his M.A. from the University of London in 1946, and a degree from Jews College in  1947.  He married Hebrew College librarian Helen Horowitz on March 23, 1947, and was a Lecturer at University College London from 1946 to 1949. He made aliyah to Israel in 1949, hoping to study at Hebrew University, but they were not accepting students for doctorates. Sarna emigrated to the United States in 1951, and received his Ph.D. from Dropsie College for Hebrew and Cognate Learning in 1955.  He studied at various times under Cyrus Gordon, Isidore Epstein and Arthur Marmorstein, and was strongly influenced by the work of Yehezkel Kaufmann (as can be seen, for example, in his discussion of apostolic prophecy on p.xxviii of Understanding Genesis.)

He was a lecturer at Gratz College in Philadelphia from 1951 to 1957, a librarian and then associate professor of Bible at the Jewish Theological Seminary of America, respectively, from 1957 to 1963, and from 1963 to 1965.  He then moved to Newton, Massachusetts  to be associate professor at Brandeis University from 1965 to 1967, Dora Golding Professor of Biblical Studies from 1967 on, and chair of department of Near Eastern and Judaic Studies from 1969 on. He was also a visiting professor at Columbia University, Andover Newton Theological School, and Dropsie College at various times throughout the 1960s.  He left Brandeis in 1985 to teach at Florida Atlantic University and live in Boca Raton, where he died after a long illness in 2005.  He is buried in Beth El Cemetery, one of the Baker Street Jewish Cemeteries in West Roxbury, Boston, Massachusetts.

Sarna's son Jonathan, a resident of Newton, Massachusetts, is the Joseph H. & Belle R. Braun Professor of American Jewish History at Brandeis University.

Works 
Among Sarna's extensive publications are a large number of works intended for a popular audience, and through these works he succeeded in introducing many laypeople to the modern study of the Bible.  Some of these works are listed below:

Awards 

 1967: National Jewish Book Award in the Jewish Thought category for Understanding Genesis

References

External links 
 Contemporary Authors Online entry for Sarna, Nahum M(attathias), Thomson Gale, 2005.
  Encyclopedia Judaica biography for Prof. Nahum M. Sarna, z"l

1923 births
2005 deaths
Jewish biblical scholars
American biblical scholars
British biblical scholars
Translators of the Bible into English
British emigrants to the United States
20th-century American Jews
English Jews
Academics of University College London
Alumni of the London School of Jewish Studies
Alumni of the University of London
Brandeis University faculty
Jewish translators of the Bible
20th-century Jewish biblical scholars
21st-century American Jews